May Minamahal may refer to:
May Minamahal (film), a 1993 Filipino film
May Minamahal (TV series), a Filipino TV series based on the film